City Creek may refer to any of the following:
City Creek (California), a tributary of the Santa Ana River
City Creek (South Dakota)
City Creek (Utah), a tributary of the Jordan River (Utah)
City Creek Center, shopping center development in Salt Lake City